Tui Alfreda Mayo  (13 January 1905 – 8 March 1993) was a New Zealand nurse, hospital matron and local politician. She was born in Aorangi, Manawatu/Horowhenua, New Zealand, on 13 January 1905.

In the 1979 New Year Honours, Mayo was awarded the Queen's Service Medal for public services.

References

1905 births
1993 deaths
Local politicians in New Zealand
New Zealand nurses
Recipients of the Queen's Service Medal
New Zealand women nurses
20th-century New Zealand politicians